Muvumbe Hydroelectric Power Station is a  hydroelectric power station in the Western Region of Uganda.

Location
The power station was built across the River Nyakijumba (also known as the River Maziba or the River Muvumbe), a tributary of the Kagera River. The station is in Kigarama village in Nyanja parish, Maziba Sub-county, Kabale District, in south-western Uganda, close to the international border with Rwanda. The coordinates of the power station are 1°19'07.0"S, 30°04'44.0"E (Latitude=-1.318611; Longitude=30.078889).

History
The new power plant lies at the site of a smaller  hydroelectric power plant that was constructed in 1966 but went out of commission in 2002 due to disrepair and silting. In 2009, a new feasibility study was carried out by Lahmeyer International, a German consulting engineering firm, paving way for the new power plant. In April 2014, Muvumbe Hydro (Uganda) Limited applied for a power production license from the Electricity Regulatory Authority to generate and sell 6.5 megawatts of hydroelectric power at this power station. The power will be sold to the Uganda Electricity Transmission Company Limited and integrated into the national grid. Construction started in September 2015 and is expected to last 18 months.

Construction costs
The estimated costs for the dam and power plant is US$18 million (approximately UGX:64 billion). Construction funds will be sourced jointly by the Sri Lankan developers and the government of Uganda. In January 2015, Ugandan Prime Minister Ruhakana Rugunda indicated that funding for the dam had been secured from Germany. Muvumbe Hydro Uganda Limited, a subsidiary of Vidullanka Plc. of Sri Lanka, owns the development rights to the project.

Construction timeline
Construction started in September 2015 and commercial power production began in March 2017.

See also

List of power stations in Uganda

References

External links
 Homepage of Muvumbe Hydro Uganda Limited
  Overview of Uganda's Energy Sector In 2012

2017 establishments in Uganda
Hydroelectric power stations in Uganda
Kabale District